This is a list of prefects of Lika-Senj County.

Prefects of Lika-Senj County (1993–present)

See also
Lika-Senj County

Notes

External links
World Statesmen - Lika-Senj County

Lika-Senj County